Paulo Roberto Cardoso Rodrigues, known as Paulo Roberto (born 4 July 1985) is a Brazilian football player.

Club career
He made his professional debut in the Segunda Liga for Belenenses on 22 August 2012 in a game against Braga B.

References

1985 births
Footballers from Rio de Janeiro (city)
Living people
Brazilian footballers
Brazilian expatriate footballers
Expatriate footballers in Portugal
Brazilian expatriate sportspeople in Portugal
A.D. Sanjoanense players
SC Mirandela players
C.F. Os Belenenses players
F.C. Penafiel players
Académico de Viseu F.C. players
S.C. Freamunde players
C.D.C. Montalegre players
GD Bragança players
Association football forwards